Sainte-Eulalie-en-Royans (Vivaro-Alpine: Santa Eulàlia de Roians) is a commune in the Drôme department in the region Auvergne-Rhone-Alpes, southeastern France.

Population

Geography
Sainte-Eulalie-en-Royans is located 7 km northeast of Saint-Jean-en-Royans (capital of the canton) and 34 km east of Romans-sur-Isere.

The bordering communes are Pont-en-Royans, Saint-Laurent-en-Royans and Échevis.

Remarkable Geographical Sites
The "Réculée des Grands Goulets" is a remarkable geological site of 1,645.95 hectares, crossed by the Vernaison, which is located in the towns of Châtelus (in the place called Grands Goulets), La Chapelle-en-Vercors, Échevis, Sainte-Eulalie-en-Royans, Saint-Julien-en-Vercors, Saint-Laurent-en-Royans, Saint-Martin-en-Vercors and Pont-en-Royans. In 2014, it was classified in the "Inventory of Geological Heritage"».

History
January 9, 1965: "Sainte-Eulalie" was changed to the longer "Sainte-Eulalie-en-Royans."

See also
Communes of the Drôme department
Parc naturel régional du Vercors

References

Communes of Drôme